28 mm (twenty-eight millimeter):

 28 mm film
 28 mm scale of miniature figures